Bellwood is a census-designated place (CDP) in Chesterfield County, Virginia, United States. The population was 6,352 at the 2010 census. The community takes its name from from Bellwood, one of the James River Plantations.

Geography
Bellwood is located at  (37.405598, -77.434205).

Demographics
As of the census of 2000, there were 5,974 people, 2,323 households, and 1,598 families residing in the CDP. The population density was 1,005.0 people per square mile (388.3/km2). There were 2,448 housing units at an average density of 411.8/sq mi (159.1/km2). The racial makeup of the CDP was 69.17% White, 20.32% African American, 0.80% Native American, 2.56% Asian, 0.03% Pacific Islander, 4.35% from other races, and 2.76% from two or more races. Hispanic or Latino of any race were 7.52% of the population.

There were 2,323 households, out of which 36.1% had children under the age of 18 living with them, 43.7% were married couples living together, 18.1% had a female householder with no husband present, and 31.2% were non-families. 25.2% of all households were made up of individuals, and 7.7% had someone living alone who was 65 years of age or older. The average household size was 2.57 and the average family size was 3.05.

In the CDP, the population was spread out, with 28.4% under the age of 18, 8.6% from 18 to 24, 31.9% from 25 to 44, 21.9% from 45 to 64, and 9.2% who were 65 years of age or older. The median age was 34 years. For every 100 females, there were 98.4 males. For every 100 females age 18 and over, there were 95.8 males.

The median income for a household in the CDP was $34,433, and the median income for a family was $39,632. Males had a median income of $28,144 versus $25,000 for females. The per capita income for the CDP was $16,764. About 13.6% of families and 16.8% of the population were below the poverty line, including 30.0% of those under age 18 and 9.5% of those age 65 or over.

References

Census-designated places in Chesterfield County, Virginia
Census-designated places in Virginia
Populated places on the James River (Virginia)